The following is a list of teams and cyclists who will take part in the 2023 Giro d'Italia.

Teams

UCI WorldTeams

 
 
 
 
 
 
 
 
 
 
 
 
 
 
 
 
 
 

UCI ProTeams

Cyclists

By starting number

References